Elium, previously referred to as Knowledge Plaza, is a Software as a Service used for enterprise knowledge sharing within organisations. It supports use cases for knowledge management, social bookmarking, document management, wikis and internal social network. It was initially designed as an information management tool for knowledge workers and is often used for collaborative research projects, market intelligence, information brokerage, etc.

The vendor's company, Whatever S.A., has its headquarters based at the Louvain-la-Neuve Science Park (Louvain-la-Neuve, Belgium) and offices in Geneva, Switzerland. In September 2013, it announced the acquisition of Swiss social publishing company Hyperweek.

In an annual benchmark carried out by French consultancy firm Lecko (previously named USEO), Elium is referred to as the pioneer of social knowledge management tools amongst the more generic family of enterprise social software. The analysis concludes that Elium strikes a balance between a traditional document management system and more community-orientated environments such as Jive SBS.

In March 2017, Knowledge Plaza changed its name to Elium.

In August 2017, Elium announced the closing of a Series A funding round for €4 million led by Serena Capital in collaboration with S.R.I.W.

Awards 

 In May 2011, Elium received the "Belgian Start-up of the year" Award from Belgian's leading ICT Magazine Datanews.
 In October 2010, Elium was nominated KMWorld Promise Award 2010 finalist.
 In June 2010, Elium won the prize for the most innovative knowledge management tool at KM Forum conference in Paris.
 In 2008, Elium won the Prix Lionel Van den Bossche 2008 award given each year to a Belgian innovative enterprise.

Features 

Elium applies a collective classification mechanism to all information formats including websites (like Delicious), as well as documents, contacts, e-mails, book references and wikis – as underlined by the comparison of enterprise bookmarking platforms.

Feature set:
 Combined full-text social search and faceted navigation
 Bookmarklet for adding/sharing/organizing websites
 Pipelines for adding/sharing/organizing emails and their attachments
 Workspaces and communities for various security/visibility settings
 Collaborative content creation (wiki pages)
 Full export and summary of information packages
 Custom e-mail digests and alerts
 Custom vertical search engines based on shared bookmarks
 Tag management abilities that mix a company-defined taxonomy and user-generated folksonomy. KP's approach was described by Thomas Vander Wal as "working wonderfully".

References

External links 
 

Knowledge management
Internet Protocol based network software
Collective intelligence
Proprietary wiki software
Document management systems
Content management systems
Professional networks